Šaban Bajramović (16 April 1936 – 8 June 2008), nicknamed Šabi (Шаби), was a Serbian vocalist and recording artist of Arlije Romani ethnicity. He was one of the most internationally critically acclaimed Romani singer-songwriters. Due to his eminent impact on music in Eastern Europe, he was dubbed the "King of Romani music".

Biography

Origin and early life 
Bajramović was born in Niš into a Muslim Roma family of Romani people in Serbia, of the Arlije in the Gypsy quarters (Ciganska mahala). He spoke of himself "I am not Romani, I am a Serb, a Serbian Gypsy". He attended primary school in Niš for only the first four years. On quitting school, he picked up his musical education on the street. He was nicknamed Šabi (Шаби). His childhood was noted by extreme poverty, thus he worked as a busker to provide an income for his very poor family. In his free time, he enjoyed playing football, but was diagnosed with poliomyelitis as a child, which lead to a decline in his amateur football career.

Imprisonment 
At 19 years he ran away from the army, out of love. As a deserter, he was sentenced to three years prison on the island Goli Otok. He spent his time as a good goalkeeper in the prison football team. Because of his nimbleness and speed, they called him "Black Panther". Soon he forced his way into the prison orchestra that played, among other things, jazz (mostly Louis Armstrong, Frank Sinatra, and sometimes John Coltrane) with Spanish and Mexican pieces.

Music career 
After Goli Otok, his intensive music career began. He made his first record in 1964, with the recording act Crna mamba (Black Mamba). He continued to produce music with Crna mamba for 20 years. The highlight of their career was their performance for Indira Gandhi in India, where he gained the title King of Romani music. He also performed to Yugoslav politician Josip Broz Tito.

In the early nineties, he recorded "Đelem, Đelem", which is considered the Romani people's ethnic anthem. At the time, he decided to change his stage presence, starting to wear sunglasses while performing.

Since 2000, he started collaborating with Bosnian-based Sevdah act Mostar Sevdah Reunion, which rose him to prominence yet again. In 2001, he recorded the album A Gipsy Legend with the group, released on behalf of World Connection, which gained international attention.

In 2002, he worked with Croatian band Cubismo. Their partnership resulted in the appearance of "Geljan dade", one of Bajramović's best known songs. Published on the album Romano raj, the song was noted for its complex structure and lyrical content. The abstract motif of the song presents suffering people of Romani descent whose fathers went the United States to provide income for their children, ultimately leading to more problems due to their absence. Geljan dade was covered by a wide range of musicians from varying genres, including Gru, Muharem Serbezovski and Boban Zdravković. Zdravković performed the first known version of the song in Serbian, titled "Prokleta je Amerika".

In 2005, Miloš Stojanović and Dragi Šestić directed his biopic film, titled Šaban, which gained notoriety in Eastern Europe. For the purposes of that documentary Dragi Šestić produced the album for Snail Records with the title "Saban", which won a World Music Award.

In 2008, he produced Lova with Serbian hip-hop artist Sky Wikluh for the Serbian TV series Vratice se rode.

Last years 

In 2008, it was revealed that Bajramović was living impoverished in Niš with serious health complications and was no longer able to walk. The government of Serbia intervened to provide him with some funds. He died in Niš on 8 June 2008, from a heart attack.

Personal life 
Bajramović enjoyed reading, and claimed he read over 20,000 books. He was married to Milica Bajramović and had four children.

Legacy

Influence 
Bajramović was a prominent figure in Serbian music presenting Romani music in modern Serbian. Due to his enormous influence, on 12 August 2010, a statue to honour his impact was built. The statue had been vandalised multiple times.

Time Magazine polled Bajramović in the top 10 best jazz musicians.

Quotes 

Dragi Šestić – Mostar Sevdah Reunion

Andy Gill – The Independent, UK, 15 February 2002

References

Sources

External links 

 Record Label
 Šaban Bajramović Unofficial Presentation
 Šaban Bajramović CDs
 Saban Bajramovic: Serbian esteemed as king of Gypsy singers, The Times, 23 June 2008

1936 births
2008 deaths
Serbian songwriters
Romani musicians
Serbian composers
Serbian multi-instrumentalists
Serbian baritones
Serbian Romani people
Musicians from Niš
Serbian prisoners and detainees
Yugoslav Romani people
Yugoslav male singers
20th-century Serbian male singers
World Music Awards winners
Indexi Award winners
Romani singers